BRC may refer to:

Organisations and institutes
 Bioinformatics Resource Centers, a group of Internet-based research centres for infectious disease research
 Biological Records Centre, a data and records repository for UK species
 Bisexual Resource Center, an educational non-profit in the US
 Black Radical Congress, a social justice organisation for those of African descent in the US
 Black Resource Centre, an Aboriginal Australian organisation in the mid-1970s
 Black Rock Coalition, an artists' collective
 British Rabbit Council, an organisation for owners of pet rabbits
 British Red Cross, a humanitarian network in the UK, affiliated with the international Red Cross 
 British Retail Consortium, a trade association for retail traders in the UK
 Brotherhood of Railway Carmen (1890-1986), a US trade union
 Bulgarian Red Cross, a humanitarian network in Bulgaria, affiliated with the international Red Cross

Travel and transport
 Belt Railway of Chicago, the terminal railroad in Chicago
 British Rally Championship, a former car rallying series in the UK
 San Carlos de Bariloche Airport, Argentina, IATA code
 Vadodara Junction railway station, India, station code

Other
 Black Rock City, temporary city created by Burning Man festival participants
 Basic Reconnaissance Course of the United States Marine Corps Reconnaissance Training Company